Pilates For Indie Rockers is a fitness video that matches a traditional pilates workout with contemporary indie rock music and attitude.

The DVD features certified yoga instructor Chaos running a mat-style pilates workout with the assistance of Page Turner, who demonstrates the beginner moves. The DVD also features a Beginner's Session and three audio "channels" of musical soundscapes: pop-punk, indie, and heavy. 

The DVD is slated for a November 13, 2007 nationwide release by HALO 8 Entertainment. Its sister-release Yoga For Indie Rockers was released on October 30, 2007.

Track listing

Music Channel 1
 From The Bottom Of This Bottle - Crash Romeo
 Catastrophe - Deciding Tonight
 Run This City - Jet Lag Gemini
 We Want Guarantees, Not Hunger Pains - Closure In Moscow
 Last One To Know - Hello Nurse
 You Can Wake Up Now - Disarming Arctica
 Glass Figurines - DoubleheadeR
 Too Late For Us - BEDlight For BlueEYES
 Giving It All Tonight - Roses Are Red
 Last Day Of Winter - Pelican (closing meditation)

Music Channel 2
 Beds and Lawns - Sorry About Dresden
 Damage Done - Veruca Salt
 Please Fire Me - The Icarus Line
 Kiss The Haze - House of Fools
 Glories Yesterday - Two Lone Swordsmen
 Lady Faire - The Cassettes
 Run Together - Criteria
 Radar - Radio Vago

Music Channel 3
 Dangerous - The End
 TwentyXXSeven - Bring Out Your Dead
 Setting Fire To Sleeping Giants - The Dillinger Escape Plan
 Permanence - This Is Hell
 Hunt You Down - Alec Empire
 Who Believes Enough? - Ladyfinger
 Stalwart Carapace - Edgey

References

External links
 Official site, redirects to MySpace

Aerobic exercise
Pilates